The Saint Lucia Davis Cup team represents Saint Lucia in Davis Cup tennis competition and are governed by the St. Lucia Lawn Tennis Association. They have not competed since 2006.

Their best finish is eighth in Group III.

History
Saint Lucia competed in its first Davis Cup in 1998.  They had previously competed as part of the Eastern Caribbean team.

Last team (2006) 

 Trevor Hunte (Captain-player)
 Vernon Lewis
 Sirsean Arlain
 Alberton Richelieu

See also
Davis Cup

External links

δ Saint Lucia
Davis Cup
Davis Cup
1998 establishments in Saint Lucia